Myers House is a historic home located at Martinsburg, Berkeley County, West Virginia. It was built about 1817 and is a two-story, Federal-style, brick dwelling. It is five bays wide with a gable roof.  The entrance features a Chippendale style transom.

It was listed on the National Register of Historic Places in 1980.

References

Federal architecture in West Virginia
Houses completed in 1817
Houses in Berkeley County, West Virginia
Houses on the National Register of Historic Places in West Virginia
Houses in Martinsburg, West Virginia
National Register of Historic Places in Martinsburg, West Virginia